Vasyl Vasylyovych Malyuk (born 28 February 1983), is a Ukrainian political military officer and brigadier general, who is since 7 February 2023 the head of the Security Service of Ukraine (SBU). He was already the acting SBU head from 18 July 2022. Prior to this he had made a career in the SBU since 2001. This career had been interrupted by a short stint as Deputy Minister of Internal Affairs of Ukraine in February and March 2022.

Malyuk became a member of the National Security and Defense Council of Ukraine on 4 August 2022.

He is a candidate of legal sciences.

Biography

Vasyl Malyuk was born in Korostyshiv on 28 February 1983.

Since 2001, Malyuk has been in military service in state security agencies. During his service in the regional offices of the Security Service of Ukraine (SBU), he held positions ranging from operations officer to deputy head of the department (head of the department for combating corruption and organized crime).

From January 2020 to 13 March 2020, Malyuk was the first deputy head of the Main Directorate for Combating Corruption and Organized Crime of the SBU.

On 13 March 2020 Malyk was promoted first deputy head of the SBU as the head of the Department for Combating Corruption and Organized Crime of the Central Directorate of the SBU until he was dismissed on 26 July 2021.

On 16 February 2022, by order of Prime Minister Denys Shmyhal, Malyuk was appointed Deputy Minister of Internal Affairs.

On 3 March 2022, by decree of President Volodymyr Zelenskyy, Malyuk was appointed the first deputy head of the SBU.

On 25 March 2022 Malyuk was promoted to brigadier general.

On 18 July 2022, Malyuk became the acting Director of the SBU.

Malyuk has been a member of the National Security and Defense Council of Ukraine since 4 August 2022.

On 6 February 2023 President Zelenskyy send a proposition to parliament to appoint Malyuk as head of the Security Service of Ukraine. The following day parliament appointed him. 324 deputies (of the total 411) voted for the relevant resolution, Malyuk received no support from the parties European Solidarity and Holos.

References

1983 births
Living people
People from Korostyshiv
Directors of the Security Service of Ukraine
National Security and Defense Council of Ukraine